William Alexander Flemming (September 4, 1897 – June 19, 1976) was a Canadian politician. He represented the electoral district of Colchester in the Nova Scotia House of Assembly from 1928 to 1937. He was a member of the Conservative Party of Nova Scotia.

Born in 1897 at Truro, Nova Scotia, Flemming was educated at the Nova Scotia Agricultural College, and the Ontario Agricultural College. He married Helen Catherine Dunlop in 1919, and was a farmer and businessman by career. Flemming entered provincial politics in 1928, when he was elected in the dual-member Colchester riding with Conservative Frank Stanfield. In the 1933 election, he was re-elected with Conservative George Y. Thomas. Flemming did not reoffer in the 1937 election. He died at Truro on June 18, 1976.

References

1897 births
1976 deaths
Nova Scotia Agricultural College alumni
Ontario Agricultural College alumni
People from Truro, Nova Scotia
Progressive Conservative Association of Nova Scotia MLAs